Gmina Niemce is a rural gmina (administrative district) in Lublin County, Lublin Voivodeship, in eastern Poland.

Villages
Gmina Niemce contains the villages and settlements of Baszki, Boduszyn, Bystrzyca-Kolonia, Ciecierzyn, Dys, Dziuchów, Elizówka, Jakubowice Konińskie, Jakubowice Konińskie-Kolonia, Kawka, Krasienin, Krasienin-Kolonia, Łagiewniki, Leonów, Ludwinów, Majdan Krasieniński, Nasutów, Niemce, Nowy Staw, Osówka, Pólko, Pryszczowa Góra, Rudka Kozłowiecka, Stoczek, Stoczek-Kolonia, Swoboda, Wola Krasienińska, Wola Niemiecka and Zalesie.

Neighbouring gminas
Gmina Niemce is bordered by the city of Lublin and by the gminas of Garbów, Jastków, Kamionka, Lubartów, Spiczyn and Wólka.

References

External links
Polish official population figures 2006

Niemce
Lublin County